Aristarkhov is a Russian masculine surname, its feminine counterpart is Aristarkhova. It may refer to
Maksim Aristarkhov (born 1980), Russian football player
Natalya Aristarkhova (born 1989), Russian middle-distance runner

Russian-language surnames